Scythris ochroplicella is a moth of the family Scythrididae. It was described by Bengt Å. Bengtsson in 2014. It is found in South Africa (KwaZulu-Natal).

References

Endemic moths of South Africa
ochroplicella
Moths described in 2014